George Cooke (c.1705–1768) was an English barrister and politician.

Life
He entered the Inner Temple in 1717, and was called to the bar in 1728.

Cooke was in practice as a barrister until his father died, in 1740. He had the life appointment as chief prothonotary, from 1732, and also inherited the family estate, Harefield in Middlesex.

At this stage, Horace Walpole called him "a pompous Jacobite". Initially a Tory, he became a follower of William Pitt the elder in the later 1750s. In the 1760s he opposed the Stamp Act 1765. He was still the member for Middlesex when he died on 5 June 1768.

Family
Cooke married Catherine, daughter of Sir Thomas Twisden, 4th Baronet, in 1735; they had seven sons. The heir was George John Cooke, who became a Lieutenant-General in the Army.

Notes

1768 deaths
English barristers
Members of the Parliament of Great Britain for constituencies in Cornwall
Members of the Parliament of Great Britain for English constituencies
British MPs 1741–1747
British MPs 1747–1754
British MPs 1754–1761
British MPs 1761–1768
British MPs 1768–1774
Members of the Inner Temple
People from Harefield
Year of birth uncertain